The Roggenstock (1,778 m) is a mountain of the Swiss Prealps, located south of Oberiberg in the canton of Schwyz. It lies north of the Hoch-Ybrig area.

References

External links
Roggenstock on Hikr

Mountains of the Alps
Mountains of the canton of Schwyz
Mountains of Switzerland